This is a list of the National Register of Historic Places listings in McMullen County, Texas.

This is intended to be a complete list of properties listed on the National Register of Historic Places in McMullen County, Texas. There is one property listed on the National Register in the county.

Current listings 

|}

See also

National Register of Historic Places listings in Texas
Recorded Texas Historic Landmarks in McMullen County

References

See also

McMullen County, Texas
McMullen County
Buildings and structures in McMullen County, Texas